Diane S. Cummins (born 19 January 1974 in Pinetown, KwaZulu-Natal) is a middle distance runner from Canada. She set her personal best (1:58.39) in the women's 800 metres on 2 September 2001 at a meet in Rieti (Italy). She was born in South Africa.

Achievements

See also
 Canadian records in track and field

References
trackfield.brinkster

External links
 

1974 births
Living people
People from Pinetown
South African emigrants to Canada
Canadian female middle-distance runners
Athletes (track and field) at the 1998 Commonwealth Games
Athletes (track and field) at the 2002 Commonwealth Games
Athletes (track and field) at the 2004 Summer Olympics
Athletes (track and field) at the 2006 Commonwealth Games
Athletes (track and field) at the 1999 Pan American Games
Athletes (track and field) at the 2007 Pan American Games
Athletes (track and field) at the 2010 Commonwealth Games
Olympic track and field athletes of Canada
Commonwealth Games silver medallists for Canada
Commonwealth Games bronze medallists for Canada
Pan American Games gold medalists for Canada
Commonwealth Games medallists in athletics
Pan American Games medalists in athletics (track and field)
Medalists at the 2007 Pan American Games
Medallists at the 1998 Commonwealth Games
Medallists at the 2002 Commonwealth Games
Medallists at the 2010 Commonwealth Games